2005 U.S. Open may refer to:
2005 U.S. Open (golf), a major golf tournament
2005 US Open (tennis), a Grand Slam tennis tournament
2005 Lamar Hunt U.S. Open Cup, a soccer tournament for U.S. teams